is a Japanese light novel series written by Broccoli Lion. Originally published via the novel posting website Shōsetsuka ni Narō in October 2015, the series was later acquired by Micro Magazine, who began publishing the series in print with illustrations by Sime. A manga adaptation, illustrated by Hiiro Akikaze, began serialization on the Niconico-based web manga platform Suiyōbi no Sirius in June 2017. An anime television series adaptation by Yokohama Animation Laboratory and Cloud Hearts is set to premiere in July 2023.

Characters

Media

Light novel
Written by Broccoli Lion, the series began publication on the novel posting website Shōsetsuka ni Narō on October 17, 2015. It was later acquired by Micro Magazine, who began publishing the series in print with illustrations by Sime on August 30, 2016. As of January 2022, ten volumes have been released.

In October 2020, J-Novel Club announced that they licensed the novels for English publication.

Volume list

Manga
A manga adaptation, illustrated by Hiiro Akikaze, began serialization on Kodansha's Niconico-based Suiyōbi no Sirius manga service on January 27, 2017. As of October 2022, the series' individual chapters have been collected into ten tankōbon volumes.

At Anime Expo 2019, Vertical announced that they licensed the series for English publication.

Volume list

Anime
An anime television series adaptation was announced on October 7, 2022. It is produced by Yokohama Animation Laboratory and Cloud Hearts, and directed by Masato Tamagawa, with scripts supervised by Keiichirō Ōchi, and character designs handled by Guonian Wang. The series is set to premiere in July 2023 on TBS and BS11.

Reception
The series won the gold award (effectively second place) at the 4th Net Novel Award.

The novel series has sold over two million copies.

References

External links
  
  
 

2016 Japanese novels
Anime and manga based on light novels
Cloud Hearts
Fiction about reincarnation
Isekai anime and manga
Isekai novels and light novels
J-Novel Club books
Japanese webcomics
Kodansha manga
Light novels
Light novels first published online
Shōnen manga
Shōsetsuka ni Narō
Slice of life anime and manga
TBS Television (Japan) original programming
Upcoming anime television series
Vertical (publisher) titles
Webcomics in print
Yokohama Animation Laboratory